German submarine U-260 was a Type VIIC U-boat built for Nazi Germany's Kriegsmarine for service during World War II.
Her keel was laid down 7 May 1941 by Bremer Vulkan, of Bremen-Vegesack. She was commissioned 14 March 1942 with Kapitänleutnant Herbertus Purkhold in command.

Design
German Type VIIC submarines were preceded by the shorter Type VIIB submarines. U-260 had a displacement of  when at the surface and  while submerged. She had two shafts and two  propellers.

U-260 was fitted with five  torpedo tubes (four fitted at the bow and one at the stern), fourteen torpedoes, one  SK C/35 naval gun, 220 rounds, and two twin  C/30 anti-aircraft guns. The boat had a complement of between forty-four and sixty.

Service history
U-260 conducted nine patrols in total. On her second, U-260 was part of Spitz wolfpack which attacked Convoy ON-154, making contact with the convoy on 28 December 1942, and sinking the 4,893 GRT British freighter Empire Wagtail (lost with all hands – 43 dead). This was the only ship sunk by U-260.

Purkhold was relieved in April 1944 by Oberleutnant zur See Klaus Becker. Becker commanded the boat until March 1945.

On 12 March 1945, U-260 was scuttled south of neutral Ireland, in position , after sustaining mine damage.

After the sinking, a sealed container of papers floated to the surface. A British expert flew to Cork to examine them.

The crew of five officers and 48 crew were interned in Ireland for the remainder of the war. In her entire career, U-260 suffered no casualties to her crew.

Wolfpacks
U-260 took part in 16 wolfpacks, namely:
 Blitz (22 – 26 September 1942) 
 Tiger (26 – 30 September 1942) 
 Luchs (1 – 6 October 1942) 
 Panther (6 – 11 October 1942) 
 Südwärts (24 – 26 October 1942) 
 Spitz (22 – 31 December 1942) 
 Seeteufel (21 – 30 March 1943) 
 Löwenherz (1 – 10 April 1943) 
 Lerche (10 – 15 April 1943) 
 Specht (21 April – 4 May 1943) 
 Fink (4 – 6 May 1943) 
 Leuthen (15 – 24 September 1943) 
 Rossbach (24 September – 7 October 1943) 
 Rügen 6 (28 December 1943 – 2 January 1944) 
 Rügen 5 (2 – 7 January 1944) 
 Rügen (7 – 11 January 1944)

Post war
The wreck site of U-260 was discovered in 1975 by local fisherman Colin Barnes after snagging nets, although it was presumed that the wreck of Counsellor (sunk due to a mine in 1917) was in the area. A friend of Mr Barnes, Joe Barry, dived on the noted position and discovered the U-boat rather than the expected cargo ship.

There is recent speculation that U-260 did not actually strike a mine, but instead struck an underwater pinnacle (now known as '78 Rock' but which was uncharted at the time) leading to its damaged state.

On 2 July 2014, two experienced divers died whilst exploring the wreck. The divers had deviated from their dive plan by staying down too long, and ascended too quickly from the wreck. Both men were ruled to have died due to complications from the bends. The body of one diver was immediately recovered, and the body of the second diver was recovered later that afternoon.

Summary of raiding history

References

Bibliography

External links

Gordon Mumford's account of Convoy ONS-154
Silent Waters Running Deep - Irish Television production on U-260 (pages include copyright underwater pictures of the wreck)
Dive review and further history (appeared in Diver Magazine July 1997)
Irish Wrecks Online entry for U-260
U-260 dive review

German Type VIIC submarines
U-boats commissioned in 1942
U-boats scuttled in 1945
World War II submarines of Germany
1942 ships
Ships built in Bremen (state)
Ships sunk with no fatalities
U-boats sunk by mines
Maritime incidents in March 1945